Micropterix garganoensis is a species of moth belonging to the family Micropterigidae. It was described by Heath in 1960. It is known from Italy. (Gargano)

Gallery

References

External links
Image

Micropterigidae
Moths described in 1960
Endemic fauna of Italy
Moths of Europe